Cave del Predil is a frazione subdivision of the comune of Tarvisio in the Province of Udine, in the Friuli-Venezia Giulia region of northeastern Italy.

Geography
The hamlet is located about 15 km (9 mi) south of the Tarvis town centre, in the valley of the Rio del Lago (Seebachtal) between the Montasio and Mangart massifs of the Julian Alps. The parallel road runs further up to the picturesque Lago del Predil and the Sella Nevea mountain pass. An eastern branch-off leads to Predil Pass at the border with Slovenia.

History

The lead and zinc mining community was first mentioned in a 1320 deed issued by the Habsburg duke Frederick the Fair, at the time when the surrounding estates belonged to the Carinthian possessions held by the Prince-Bishopric of Bamberg. The bishops also gained control over the trade route across the Nevea mountain pass leading to the city of Cividale del Friuli, the importance of which however diminished, after the Friulian lands in the south had been conquered by the Republic of Venice by 1420. Bamberg finally sold its remote Carinthian estates to Empress Maria Theresa in 1759, who incorporated it into the Austrian Habsburg monarchy.

With the Duchy of Carinthia, Cave del Predil until World War I was part of Austria-Hungary, and by the 1919 Treaty of Saint-Germain came under control of the Kingdom of Italy. A local museum covers the military history of the Alpine campaigns from the Napoleonic Wars to World War II. Under Italian control the mines, temporarily managed by Bernardino Nogara, operated until 1991; since then, the population has sharply decreased.

Gallery

References

See also
 Raibl Formation

Frazioni of the Province of Udine